Sebastián Sosa Sánchez (born 13 March 1994) is an Uruguayan football player, who plays as a forward for Chilean club Everton on loan from Vélez Sarsfield.

Club career
His nickname is Bambino or El Mosquito, inherited from his father Heberley, former striker of Penarol, Nacional, Cerro Porteño and Qingdao Aokema.

Sosa made his Uruguayan Primera División debut for Cerro Largo on September 3, 2011 in a match against Fénix in the 76th minute for teammate Matías Tellechea. He made his first goal against River Plate on October 9, 2011.
On August 29, 2012 he moved to Serie A club Palermo, for 1.6 million €, signing a five-year contract.

In January 2013 he moved to Central Español on a year loan. Following that, he was loaned out to Slovak club FK Senica, where he failed to impress. On 1 September 2014, he was permanently sold to Empoli and then loaned out to Eastern Europe again, this time to Albanian Superliga club Vllaznia Shkodër.

Sosa made his first appearance with Vllaznia on 11 September 2014, starting and playing full-90 minutes in a 1–1 home draw against KF Tirana, in a match which would be remembered mostly for the incidents inside and outside the field. He opened his scoring account on 27 September where he scored the winning goal against KF Elbasani, helping Vllaznia to reach the third victory of the season.

After playing for Patronato, in January 2022 he joined Boston River and was immediately loaned to Vélez Sarsfield on a deal for a year with an option to buy. At the end of June 2022, Sosa left Veléz to join Everton de Viña del Mar in the Chilean Primera División on a new loan spell until the end of the year.

International career
Sosa has played for Uruguay U20, scoring twice in five appearances.

References

External links

1994 births
Living people
People from Melo, Uruguay
Uruguayan footballers
Uruguay under-20 international footballers
Uruguayan expatriate footballers
Association football forwards
Uruguayan Primera División players
Serie A players
Uruguayan Segunda División players
Slovak Super Liga players
Kategoria Superiore players
Primera Nacional players
Ascenso MX players
Liga MX players
Argentine Primera División players
Chilean Primera División players
Cerro Largo F.C. players
Palermo F.C. players
Central Español players
FK Senica players
Empoli F.C. players
KF Vllaznia Shkodër players
Club Nacional de Football players
Boston River players
Juventud Unida de Gualeguaychú players
Quilmes Atlético Club footballers
Atlante F.C. footballers
Querétaro F.C. footballers
Club Atlético Patronato footballers
Club Atlético Vélez Sarsfield footballers
Everton de Viña del Mar footballers
Expatriate footballers in Italy
Uruguayan expatriate sportspeople in Italy
Expatriate footballers in Slovakia
Uruguayan expatriate sportspeople in Slovakia
Expatriate footballers in Albania
Uruguayan expatriate sportspeople in Albania
Expatriate footballers in Argentina
Uruguayan expatriate sportspeople in Argentina
Expatriate footballers in Mexico
Uruguayan expatriate sportspeople in Mexico
Expatriate footballers in Chile
Uruguayan expatriate sportspeople in Chile